Michael Frontzeck (born 26 March 1964) is a German professional football coach and former player who is assistant coach of VfL Wolfsburg.

As a player he was a left back who notably played in the Bundesliga across three spells for Borussia Mönchengladbach. He also had a spell in the Premier League for Manchester City as well as playing for VfB Stuttgart, VfL Bochum and SC Freiburg He earned 19 caps for Germany and was in the squad at Euro 1992. As a manager Frontzeck has had spells in charge of Alemannia Aachen, Arminia Bielefeld, Borussia Mönchengladbach, FC St. Pauli, Hannover 96 and 1. FC Kaiserslautern.

Playing career
Frontzeck began his career in the Bundesliga in 1982 with Borussia Mönchengladbach. From 1989 to 1994, he played for VfB Stuttgart as a left back. He returned to Borussia Mönchengladbach for the season 1995–96 but then had his first stay abroad in the 1996–97 season with Manchester City. After playing for SC Freiburg and a last season for Borussia Mönchengladbach, he ended his player career in May 2000.

He played for the Germany national team from 1984 to 1992 in a total of 19 games and won a runners-up medal in UEFA Euro 1992.

Coaching career
Frontzeck started as assistant coach of Borussia Mönchengladbach from 2000 to 2003 and for Hannover 96 from 2004 to 2005. He was head coach of Alemannia Aachen from 13 September 2006 until the end of the season 2006–07 when he resigned due to the club's relegation. In January 2008, he was named head coach of Arminia Bielefeld and took over for interim head coach Detlev Dammeier after the winter break. Eventually, it was announced that his contract was extended until 2010 but on 17 May 2009, Frontzeck was fired.

Borussia Mönchengladbach
On 3 June 2009, Borussia Mönchengladbach announced Frontzeck's return to the team as new head coach. He signed a two-year-contract until 30 June 2011. Following the loss against FC St. Pauli on 13 February 2011 Frontzeck was released as head coach by the club management of Borussia Mönchengladbach. He finished with a record of 16 wins, 14 draws, and 31 losses.

FC St. Pauli
On 3 October 2012, he was named new manager of FC St. Pauli replacing André Schubert. He was sacked on 6 November 2013. He finished with a record of 15 wins, 10 draws, and 5 losses.

Hannover 96
He was appointed the new head coach of Hannover 96 on 20 April 2015. His first match was a 2–1 loss to 1899 Hoffenheim. To finish out the 2014–15 season, Hannover defeated FC Augsburg and SC Freiburg, both by a 2–1 scoreline, and two draws against VfL Wolfsburg and Werder Bremen. The win against Augsburg was Hannover's first win of 2015. On 28 May 2015, Hannover removed the interim tag and gave Frontzeck a two–year contract. He resigned on 21 December 2015. He finished with a record of seven wins, four draws, and 13 losses.

1. FC Kaiserslautern
On 1 February 2018, Frontzeck was appointed the new manager of 1. FC Kaiserslautern, replacing Jeff Strasser. His first match was a 2–1 win against Eintracht Braunschweig on 4 February 2018. He was sacked on 1 December 2018.

VfL Wolfsburg
He was named interim coach of VfL Wolfsburg on 25 October 2021. But was replaced a day later.

Coaching record

Honours
Borussia M'gladbach
DFB-Pokal runner-up: 1983–84

VfB Stuttgart
Bundesliga: 1991–92
DFL-Supercup: 1992

Germany
UEFA European Football Championship runner-up: 1992

References

External links

1964 births
Living people
Sportspeople from Mönchengladbach
Expatriate footballers in England
German footballers
German expatriate footballers
German football managers
Germany international footballers
Germany under-21 international footballers
UEFA Euro 1992 players
Borussia Mönchengladbach players
VfB Stuttgart players
VfL Bochum players
Manchester City F.C. players
SC Freiburg players
Premier League players
Bundesliga players
2. Bundesliga players
Arminia Bielefeld managers
Alemannia Aachen managers
Borussia Mönchengladbach managers
1. FC Kaiserslautern managers
Hannover 96 managers
VfL Wolfsburg managers
Bundesliga managers
2. Bundesliga managers
3. Liga managers
Footballers from North Rhine-Westphalia
German expatriate sportspeople in England
Association football defenders